The 2007–08 PBA season was the 33rd season of the Philippine Basketball Association. The season was formally opened on October 14, 2007, at the Araneta Coliseum. The league started the season with the Philippine Cup, or the traditional All-Filipino Conference, while capping off the season with the import-laiden Fiesta Conference.

Renauld "Sonny" Barrios was appointed as commissioner while serving as an officer in charge of the league until a replacement for former commissioner Noli Eala will be found.

The first activity of the season was the 2007 PBA Draft last August 19 at the Market Market in Taguig.

Board of governors

Executive committee
 Noli Eala (commissioner until August 7, 2007)
 Sonny Barrios (officer-in-charge starting August 8, 2008) 
 Tony Chua (chairman, representing Red Bull Barako)
 Joaquin L. Trillo (vice-chairman, representing Alaska Aces)
 Robert Non (treasurer, representing Barangay Ginebra Kings)

Teams

Pre-season events

San Miguel Corporation changed the name of the San Miguel Beermen to the Magnolia Beverage Masters; "Magnolia" was their product name from 1985–87.
Gec Chia and Paolo Hubalde of the Barangay Ginebra Kings were traded to the Air21 Express for Paul Artadi who was traded by the Purefoods Tender Juicy Giants.
Joseph Yeo of the Coca Cola Tigers and the team's 2009 second round draft pick rights were traded to the Sta. Lucia Realtors for Mark Isip and Cesar Catli.
On October 3, Magnolia Beverage Masters' Danny Seigle and Brgy. Ginebra's Billy Mamaril had an altercation during a pre-season tune-up game at the Greenmeadows Gym. OIC Commissioner Sonny Barrios fined Seigle P10,000.
New rules were approved in order to make the league rules more consistent to FIBA's rules rather than the National Basketball Association (NBA):
The controlled handcheck foul will be implemented.
The three-point arc would now be reset to 20 feet and 6 inches (FIBA standard) from 22 feet.
The key would now be trapezoidal (FIBA) instead of rectangular (NBA).
With a change in their team name, Magnolia unveiled their new logo and uniforms, using the blue and white motif. Alaska replaced their red uniforms with their black alternates first used in the 2007 Fiesta Conference Finals, while Purefoods replaced their navy blue dark uniforms with their red alternates from the 2007 Fiesta Conference. Red Bull introduced a new slightly-modified logo and uniforms, and Sta. Lucia slightly modified their old uniforms, adding a diagonal stripe on the shoulders.

Opening ceremonies
The season began on October 14 with the Magnolia Beverage Masters defeating the Air21 Express, 121–112.

The muses for the participating teams are as follows:

2007–08 Philippine Cup

Notable events
Red Bull Barako head coach Yeng Guiao was suspended for one game after verbally confronting league technical group chief Perry Martinez after their game against the Barangay Ginebra Kings. Serving the suspension against the Welcoat Dragons, assistant Gee Abanilla became the head coach for the game, in which Red Bull won.
Purefoods Tender Juicy Giants point guard Roger Yap was suspended for one game after hitting LA Tenorio of the Magnolia Beverage Masters; he served the suspension against the Welcoat Dragons in which Purefoods won.
In Welcoat Dragons' 126–125 overtime win against the Talk 'N Text Phone Pals, both teams converted 29 three-point field goals, a new PBA record.
On November 26, the Talk 'N Text Phone Pals traded Asi Taulava to the Coca-Cola Tigers in exchange for Ali Peek and a first-round pick.
Talk 'N Text Phone Pals players Mark Cardona and Harvey Carey were suspended after their altercation against Welcoat Dragon Jojo Tangkay. The two Phone Pals will be suspended on their game against the Air21 Express, while Carey would also be suspended on Talk 'N Text's game against the Sta. Lucia Realtors. Both Carey and Cardona were fined 20,000 pesos each. The case of Welcoat's Ryan Araña's flagrant foul on Asi Taulava on their loss against the Coca-Cola Tigers was deferred. Araña was later suspended on Welcoat's defeat against Red Bull Barako.
The Air21 Express acquired Gabby Espinas from the Magnolia Beverage Masters in exchange for one of Air21's first round picks in the 2008 Draft.
On January 17, 2008, the PBA Board of Governors named officer-in-charge Sonny Barrios as the new commissioner up to the end of the season after a deadlock ensued between governors that supported Atty. Chito Salud and Lambert Ramos. Barrios has yet to accept his appointment.
Red Bull Barako's Carlo Sharma and Jondan Salvador of the Purefoods Tender Juicy Giants were suspended for one game after figuring in a fistfight which led to their ejection from the game. Aside from the suspension, Sharma was fined P25,000 while Salvador was fined P20,000. Sharma served his suspension on game 1 of their quarterfinals series against the Magnolia Beverage Masters, in which Red Bull won; Salvador will serve his suspension in game 1 of their semifinals series against Red Bull, in which Purefoods won.
On January 24, Barrios accepted his appointment as commissioner.

Elimination round

Playoffs

Finals

|}
Finals MVP: Dennis Espino (Sta. Lucia)
Best Player of the Conference: Kelly Williams (Sta. Lucia)

Mid-season break
The Coca Cola Tigers acquired Nic Belasco from the Welcoat Dragons in exchange for Mark Isip and Coke's 2010 and 2011 second round draft picks.
Caloy Garcia was named as the new head coach of the Welcoat Dragons on March 18 after Leo Austria resigned from his post.
On March 19, Mike Cortez and Ken Bono of the Alaska Aces were traded to the Magnolia Beverage Masters for LA Tenorio and Larry Fonacier.
Purefoods Tender Juicy Giants' center Romel Adducul took a leave of absence after being diagnosed to be afflicted with nasopharyngeal cancer. This event triggered a four team trade between Purefoods, Magnolia, Coca-Cola and Barangay Ginebra. Magnolia dealt Enrico Villanueva and Willy Wilson to Coca-Cola in exchange for Chester Tolomia. Then Coke traded Villanueva to Purefoods for Marc Pingris. Pingris was then traded to Magnolia in exchange of the team's future draft pick and Wilson was sent to Barangay Ginebra in exchange for Mark Macapagal.

PBA Ateneo-La Salle Showdown
A game was held for the benefit of the PBA Players' Educational Trust Fund at the Araneta Coliseum featuring players from UAAP archrivals Ateneo and La Salle. Studio 23 aired the event with ABS-CBN Sports producing.

2008 Fiesta Conference

Notable events
Air21 Express' Homer Se was fined P20,000 for a flagrant foul-penalty 1 on their game against the Sta. Lucia Realtors when he put up a fighting stance after the looseball scramble between Williams and Air21 guard Wynne Arboleda directed towards SLR rookie Ryan Reyes and import Jamar Brown.

Elimination round

Playoff

Finals

|}
Finals MVP: Ronald Tubid and Eric Menk (Barangay Ginebra)
Best Player of the Conference: Jayjay Helterbrand (Barangay Ginebra)
Best Import of the Conference: Chris Alexander (Barangay Ginebra)

2008 PBA All-Star Weekend

The 2008 PBA All-Star Weekend was held from April 25 to 27 at Bacolod, Negros Occidental. The winners were:
Three-point Shootout: Renren Ritualo (Talk 'N Text Phone Pals)
Slam Dunk Competition: Kelly Williams (Sta. Lucia Realtors)
Legends Shootout: Active players – John Arigo (Coca Cola Tigers), Dondon Hontiveros (Magnolia Beverage Masters), Renren Ritualo (Talk 'N Text Phone Pals)

Rookie-Sophomore Blitz Game 

 Blitz Game MVP: Ronjay Buenafe (Rookies)

All-Star Game 

 All-Star Game MVP: Peter June Simon (South All-Stars)

Awards
Most Valuable Player: Kelly Williams (Sta. Lucia)
Rookie of the Year: Ryan Reyes (Sta. Lucia)
First Mythical Team:
Mark Caguioa (Brgy. Ginebra)
Jayjay Helterbrand (Brgy. Ginebra)
Arwind Santos (Air21)
Asi Taulava (Coca-Cola)
Kelly Williams (Sta. Lucia)
Second Mythical Team:
Cyrus Baguio (Red Bull)
Willie Miller (Alaska)
Kerby Raymundo (Purefoods)
Nelbert Omolon (Sta. Lucia)
Sonny Thoss (Alaska)
All-Defensive Team:
Kelly Williams (Sta. Lucia)
Ryan Reyes (Sta. Lucia)
Arwind Santos (Air21)
Marc Pingris (Magnolia)
Wynne Arboleda(Air21)
Most Improved Player: Cyrus Baguio (Red Bull)
Sportsmanship Award: Ali Peek (Talk 'N Text)

Awards given by the PBA Press Corps
Coach of the Year: Boyet Fernandez (Sta. Lucia)
Mr. Quality Minutes: Peter June Simon (Purefoods)
Comeback Player of the Year: Mike Hrabak (Red Bull)
Referee of the Year: Jess Fernandez
All-Rookie Team
Ryan Reyes (Sta. Lucia)
Chico Lañete (Purefoods)
Joe Devance (Welcoat)
Doug Kramer (Air21)
Ronjay Buenafe (Coca-Cola)

Cumulative standings

Elimination rounds

Playoffs

References

External links
PBA.ph

 
PBA